Adam Gabriel Thorn (born December 16, 1979) spent 1998–2005 as front man and lyricist for Greensboro, North Carolina, indie punk band Kudzu Wish. After bowing out at the top of their game, Thorn started the short lived Warbomb!, was employed as an assistant brewmaster, and then began crafting the music for his solo debut. Upon the release of "Where's The Freedom?" in 2007 Adam Thorn & The Top Buttons, a backing band of rotating members, played sporadic shows culminating in a performance in Greensboro, NC on December 16, 2007.

Early life

Thorn was born in Waldorf, Maryland.

Discography

Solo
Where's The Freedom? (March 2007)

Compilation
Consensus: Celebrating 36 Years Of College Radio At WQFS Greensboro (2006) song: "Speak, Imagination"
Taylor 25: A Nostalgic Retrospective (2007) song: "The Kids Are All Wrong"

External links
Official Adam Thorn website
Adam Thorn's Myspace page with Bio
Extensive audio interview with Adam Thorn on NPR Affiliate WFDD's 'Triad Arts Up Close' program, April 4, 2008
Review of Taylor 25: A Nostalgic Retrospective by Pitchfork Media
Review of Where's The Freedom? by Indyweek, a weekly magazine based in Chapel Hill, North Carolina

1979 births
American punk rock guitarists
Songwriters from Maryland
American indie rock musicians
Living people
People from Waldorf, Maryland
Singers from Maryland
Guitarists from Maryland
American male guitarists
21st-century American singers
21st-century American guitarists
21st-century American male singers
American male songwriters